The School Town of Munster is the school district that serves the town of Munster, Indiana. There are three elementary schools, a middle school, and a high school. There is also an early childhood educational center. Known for its excellence, all of the schools in this district are blue ribbon and four star rated schools. Munster High School, the district's only high school, is one of seven Indiana schools included in the Newsweek's 2006 Top Schools list at number 1,134. The school also made the list in 2008 (1257) and in 2010 (1151).

References

School districts in Indiana
Education in Lake County, Indiana